Jack McIver (born 26 April 1992) is an English cricketer. He made his first-class debut on 2 April 2015 for Oxford MCCU against Worcestershire. He has also played Minor Counties cricket for Shropshire. He was educated at Trinity College, Perth, Australia; Curtin University; and Oxford Brookes University.

References

External links
 

1992 births
Living people
English cricketers
Oxford MCCU cricketers
Cricketers from Greater London
People educated at Trinity College, Perth
Curtin University alumni
Alumni of Oxford Brookes University
Shropshire cricketers